A bulldog forceps, clamp or serrefine is a type of forceps which is used in surgery.  It has serrated jaws and a spring action so that it will grip and hold sutures, tissues or vessels.  The spring may be weak or the jaws sheathed in a soft material so that the item being gripped is not crushed too severely.

Forceps of this general type were designed by particular surgeons including Johann Dieffenbach and Robert Liston.

References

Medical clamps